Kiğı is a town and seat of the Kiğı District of Bingöl Province in Turkey. The mayor is Hikmet Özüağ (AKP).

The town is populated by Kurds of the Giransor tribe and had a population of 2,926 in 2021.

Neighborhoods 
The town is divided into the neighborhoods of Abar, Eskişehir, Yenişehir and Yeşilyurt.

History 
Historically this area was ruled by different Armenian, Byzantine, Kurdish and Turkic dynasties. During the Middle Ages, Kiğı had been a mint town of the Ilkhanids The town became a part of the Ottoman Empire was a sanjak of the Erzurum Eyalet. Historically a nearby iron mine was used but mining stopped in 17th century. The main sights in the town are the citadel, the mosque built in 1401/02 and commissioned by Pir Ali son of the Aq Qoyunlu Kutlu. The medieval Muslim tomb and bathhouse of Yazıcızadeler and the ruins of a church.  There were battles in this area between the Russians and Ottomans during World War I. The current location of the town was moved here after a Safavid raid in the 16th century, the old site was near the citadel. But the present structure is largely a restoration from later times.

Notable people 

 Munzur Çem

References

Populated places in Bingöl Province
Kiğı District
Kurdish settlements in Bingöl Province